All Lies is a 1938 German comedy film directed by Heinz Rühmann and starring Albert Matterstock, Hertha Feiler and Fita Benkhoff. It marked the directorial debut of Rühmann, a popular comedy star of the era.

It was shot at the Terra Studios in Berlin. Location shooting took place in Potsdam, Innsbruck and the Tierpark Hagenbeck in Hamburg. The film's sets were designed by the art director Willi Herrmann.

Plot
A wife waiting for her racing driver husband to return home after recovering from a serious crash is intrigued by the appearance of a mysterious woman who claims to be in a relationship with him.

Cast
Albert Matterstock as Andreas von Doerr
Hertha Feiler as Garda von Doerr
Fita Benkhoff as Elisabeth
Hilde Weissner as Joan Bennet
Johannes Riemann as Dr. Algys
Just Scheu as Dr. Spitzkötter
Eberhard Leithoff as Theobald
Rolf von Nauckhoff as Paul, Lawyer
Ursula Ulrich as Bettina
Paul Bildt as Dr. Nägeli
Charlotte Witthauer as Mrs. Müller
Lucia Lumera as Lina
Wolfgang Staudte as barmixer
Georg A. Profé as dancer
Wera Schultz as maid

See also
Must We Get Divorced? (1953)

References

External links

Films of Nazi Germany
German comedy films
1938 comedy films
German black-and-white films
Terra Film films
Films directed by Heinz Rühmann
1930s German films
1930s German-language films